was a town located in Saeki District, Hiroshima Prefecture, Japan.

On November 1, 2004, Ōgaki, along with the towns of Nōmi and Okimi (all from Saeki District), and the former town of Etajima (from Aki District), was merged to create the city of Etajima and no longer exists as an independent municipality.

As of 2003, the town had an estimated population of 8,765 and a density of 329.76 persons per km2. The total area was 26.58 km2.

External links
 Official website of Etajima in Japanese

Dissolved municipalities of Hiroshima Prefecture